"I'll Never Get Over You Getting Over Me" is a song written by Diane Warren and recorded by female contemporary R&B group Exposé. It is featured on Exposé's 1992 eponymous album. It was the second single taken from the group's third studio album and was released in early 1993. The lead vocalist was Jeanette Jurado. Although the printing on the original album refers to the song as "I'll Never Get Over You Getting Over Me," many sources (including the cassette and CD singles that were released) place the last three words of the title in parentheses.

Saxophonist Euge Groove (who was then known as Steven Grove) provided the song's instrumental solo. This marks the second time he is featured on an Exposé hit, as he was also the saxophone soloist for their #1 pop song, "Seasons Change".

This song has been covered by Irish pop group Bellefire as well as Filipino band MYMP and Soul Siren Nina.

Background
According to Jurado, composer Diane Warren had submitted "I'll Never Get Over You Getting Over Me" for consideration for Exposé to record at the same time as another Warren composition "Your Baby Never Looked Good in Blue" which appeared on the second Exposé album What You Don't Know (1989): Arista Records president Clive Davis had indicated that only one of the two songs could be recorded for the second Exposé album and although Jurado favored "I'll Never Get Over You Getting Over Me" the album's producer Lewis Martineé opted for "Your Baby Never Looked Good in Blue". Jurado - "I felt like we lost 'I'll Never Get Over You Getting Over Me'...and then come the third [album] that [song] was one of the songs Clive still held [exclusively] and I am so grateful to Diane for [allowing] that."

Reception
The song peaked at No. 8 on the Billboard Hot 100 charts in mid-1993. It also spent a week atop the adult contemporary chart in July of that year. It was Exposé's first top 10 pop hit since 1990's "Tell Me Why" and their last top 10 hit.

In the Billboard Year-End in 1993, the hit came in at number 23. Despite only peaking at number 8, the song is far closer to the year-end position of their number-one hit "Seasons Change", than to those of other top ten hits of theirs.

Music video
In the song's music video, Jurado walks pensively along the beach and thinks of her ex-boyfriend, played by actor and stuntman Greg Fitzpatrick,  while Ann Curless and Kelly Moneymaker stand under a section of the boardwalk a few yards away from her. In other scenes, the three ladies sit in front of a fire or they walk around the boardwalk. There are also flashback scenes with Jurado and boyfriend having fun together. The video was shot around and under the Santa Monica Pier in Santa Monica, California.

Charts

Weekly charts

Year-end charts

Certifications

References

External links
 music video hosted on Youtube

1993 singles
Exposé (group) songs
Songs written by Diane Warren
Pop ballads
1992 songs
Arista Records singles